List of songs recorded by Busta Rhymes

Songs

Lists of songs recorded by American artists